Alberto Escassi Oliva (born 28 February 1989) is a Spanish professional footballer who plays for Málaga CF as either a central defender or a defensive midfielder.

Club career
Escassi was born in Málaga, Andalusia. After playing with two other clubs as a youth, including hometown's Málaga CF, he finished his football grooming with Getafe CF, making his senior debut in 2008 and helping the B team promote to the Segunda División B for the first time ever in his second year.

On 13 April 2010, Escassi made his first-team – and La Liga – debut, replacing veteran Javier Casquero in the dying minutes of a 3–0 home win against Villarreal CF. On 16 December he appeared in the season's UEFA Europa League against BSC Young Boys, with the Madrid side winning 1–0 but being eliminated in the group stage.

For the 2011–12 campaign, both Escassi and teammate Adrián Sardinero were loaned to Hércules CF of the Segunda División. On 10 July 2012 both players moved on a permanent basis, with the former signing for two years.

Escassi scored his first professional goal on 26 August 2012, his team's in a 1–2 home loss against fierce rivals Elche CF. On 13 August 2014, after the Valencians' relegation, he signed a two-year deal with fellow league side AD Alcorcón.

On 30 June 2015, Escassi terminated his contract, and joined UE Llagostera also of the second tier hours later. On 28 June 2016, following their relegation, he signed for CD Numancia.

On 24 October 2017, Escassi was one of two players on target for his team as they defeated top-flight side Málaga 2–1 in the first leg of the fourth round of the Copa del Rey, in spite of trailing 0–1 in stoppage time. During the season, he was regularly deployed as a central defender by manager Jagoba Arrasate.

Escassi returned to his first club Málaga on 28 August 2020, after agreeing to a three-year deal.

References

External links

1989 births
Living people
Spanish footballers
Footballers from Málaga
Association football defenders
Association football midfielders
Association football utility players
La Liga players
Segunda División players
Segunda División B players
Tercera División players
Getafe CF B players
Getafe CF footballers
Hércules CF players
AD Alcorcón footballers
UE Costa Brava players
CD Numancia players
Málaga CF players